
Gmina Brzeg Dolny is an urban-rural gmina (administrative district) in Wołów County, Lower Silesian Voivodeship, in south-western Poland. It is part of the Wrocław metropolitan area.

Neighbouring gminas
Gmina Brzeg Dolny is bordered by the gminas of Miękinia, Oborniki Śląskie, Środa Śląska and Wołów.

Villages
Apart from the town of Brzeg Dolny, the gmina contains the villages of Bukowice, Godzięcin, Grodzanów, Jodłowice, Naborów, Pogalewo Małe, Pogalewo Wielkie, Pysząca, Radecz, Stary Dwór, Wały, Żerków and Żerkówek.

Twin towns – sister cities

Gmina Brzeg Dolny is twinned with:
 Barsinghausen, Germany
 Chernyakhovsk, Russia
 Kovel, Ukraine
 Mont-Saint-Aignan, France

References

Brzeg Dolny
Wołów County